Belle Moskowitz (October 5, 1877 – January 2, 1933) was an important Progressive reformer political influencer in the early 20th century. In her obituary, the New York Times referred to her as the most powerful woman in United States politics. She worked as a political advisor and publicist to New York Governor and 1928 Democratic presidential candidate Al Smith.

Early life
Belle Lindner was born in 1877 in Harlem in New York City, to watchmaker Isidor Lindner and Esther Freyer. Both parents were immigrants from East Prussia in Germany. She attended the Horace Mann School, a laboratory school of Teachers College, and in 1894 she attended Teachers College, Columbia University, but stayed for only one year.

Early in her life, Belle worked as an actress. She studied Oral Interpretation of Literature in school and performed for private events. She later taught acting and elocution to children and considered work as a professional actress before going into politics.

Career 

Her career in social reform began as a young girl with the Temple Israel Sisterhood who collected money, organized sewing for the poor, and worked with United Hebrew Charities. The Sisterhood also organized a "Working Girl's Vacation Fund" and a "Working Girl's Club" to improve the qualities of life for women living in the city.

In 1900, at the age of 23, she became a social worker at the Educational Alliance, an organization whose primary focus was cultural assimilation for Jewish immigrants. She held various appointments there, eventually becoming director of entertainments and exhibits. As Belle Israels, her first effort at social reform was to clean up and license the city's commercial dance halls, which she saw as places that got young working girls into trouble.  Working through the Council of Jewish Women-New York Section, by 1910 she had won laws that regulated dance hall conditions, including fire and safety and the selling of alcoholic drinks. The New York Times stated, "These laws did more to improve the moral surroundings of young girls" than any other single social reform of the period.  

Her first published article, "Social Work Among Young Women" focused on the importance of clubs in girls' socialization as well as the importance women have in shaping communities. She concluded that when women are influenced by "right ideals, social, moral, artistic, intellectual, the higher becomes their standard of living."

This work eventually led to her first major project: The Lakeview Home for Girls, which opened for permanent use 1911. The Lakeview was located on Staten Island and gave young women temporary shelter, as well as aid in finding work. Also with the Council, Moskowitz initiated a program for reform to make dance halls a safer space for young women, particularly "working girls", by controlling alcohol distribution.

After leaving the Alliance, Moskowitz (then Israel) wrote  for the United Hebrew Charities and Charities, a social work journal, for which she later became an editorial assistant.  She also joined the New York section of the Council of Jewish Women, yet another organization that helped Jewish immigrants. With her role as chair of the philanthropy committee, her focus was welfare work. She oversaw sick and poor children at a hospital on Randall's Island and visited troubled girls in reformatories.

In 1913, after the Triangle Shirtwaist Factory fire, she began working to promote the grievances of workers. She mediated disputes between the Garment District unions and employers. She held this job until fall 1916.

She also worked privately as an industrial mediator, writer, and advisor. In a flyer for her business, she offered counseling for factory planning and employment management that would benefit both employees and employers. She wrote, "“Discontented or poorly trained workers, unsuited to their jobs, threaten the peace of the shop. Whatever threatens peace threatens profit.”

Work with Al Smith 
Smith connected with Moskowitz through her work as an industrial mediator and writer. She became one of Smith's most intimate advisors, and also worked as his publicist, and he kept her close at hand throughout his eight years as governor of New York State. Visitors would note her presence in the corner of his office during critical meetings. Witnesses reported that Smith would even defer to her on major legislative proposals, waiting for her approval before making final decisions. She advised him throughout the process of enacting broad reforms for the state of New York that would later inspire and direct Franklin Delano Roosevelt in the development of the New Deal during his presidency in 1932. During her time working with Al Smith, Moskowitz mentored a young Anna M. Rosenberg in the art of wielding power behind the scenes.

When Smith became the Democratic Party candidate for President in 1928, Moskowitz worked as his campaign manager. She worked as his press agent during his attempt for renomination in 1932.

Personal life 
In 1903, she married Charles Henry Israels (1864–1911), an artist and architect, whom she met at the Alliance where he had been a volunteer club leader. They had four children, three of whom lived to adulthood: Carlos Lindner, Miriam, and Joseph. She was widowed in 1911 when Charles died of a heart disease. correction, Charles committed suicide. (See PowerBroker by Caro page 92)

She met her second husband, Henry Moskowitz, who had a Ph.D. in Philosophy and was a settlement worker on the Lower East Side, while working with him on dance hall reform.  Their paths crossed many times during the tumultuous garment strikes of the era, and they worked together on the investigations that followed the Triangle Shirtwaist Factory fire. They married in 1914. 

In 1918, she started her work with Al Smith on his campaign for Governor of New York.

On December 8, 1932, she fell down the front steps of her house and, while recovering from her broken bones, died of an embolism on January 2, 1933, at age 55.

Legacy
In 2009, the National Jewish Democratic Council gave its first "Belle Moskowitz" award to Ann Lewis.

References

Bibliography
 Perry, Elisabeth Israels (1987). Belle Moskowitz: Feminine Politics and the Exercise of Power in the Age of Alfred E. Smith. Oxford University Press

External links 
 Belle Moskowitz, Jewish Women's Archive 
 Belle Moskowitz Collection, Linda Lear Center for Special Collections & Archives, Connecticut College

1877 births
1933 deaths
 Al Smith
Teachers College, Columbia University alumni
19th-century American people
New York (state) Democrats
American women's rights activists
American people of German-Jewish descent
Burials at Sleepy Hollow Cemetery